Gary Galen Glick (May 14, 1930 – February 11, 2015) was a professional American football safety who played six seasons in the National Football League before he concluded his career in the American Football League for one season. He was the number one overall selection in the 1956 NFL Draft. To date, Glick is still the only defensive back ever to be picked first overall in any NFL draft. 

Glick attended Colorado State University (then known as Colorado A&M), where in addition to defensive back, he also starred at quarterback and linebacker and served as a place-kicker for the Rams.

Until 1985 he was a head coach for the Norfolk Neptunes and then as Offensive Coordinator for the Montreal Alouettes before becoming an NFL scout.

Glick died on February 11, 2015, aged 84, at his home in Fort Collins, Colorado, following a stroke.

References

1930 births
2015 deaths
Players of American football from Nebraska
American football quarterbacks
American football safeties
Pittsburgh Steelers players
Washington Redskins players
Baltimore Colts players
San Diego Chargers players
Colorado State Rams football players
National Football League first-overall draft picks
Montreal Alouettes coaches
People from Grant, Nebraska
American Football League players